Michael Monarch (born July 5, 1950) is an American guitarist.  He is best known for his work with the band Steppenwolf.

Monarch was born in Los Angeles. As the original lead guitarist with Steppenwolf (1967 through most of 1969), he played on all their hits, including "Born to Be Wild", "Magic Carpet Ride", and "Rock Me", while still a teenager. He also played on Janis Joplin's album I Got Dem Ol' Kozmic Blues Again Mama! and was a member of the Michael Des Barres-fronted band Detective. Monarch also worked with Roger Glover of Deep Purple, Andy Fraser of Free, Chris Hillman of The Byrds and others including many recording projects throughout the years.

Monarch performs with other 1960s and 1970s rockers in the supergroup World Classic Rockers and locally in Florida with the Peyton Monarch Band.

Discography
 Steppenwolf - Steppenwolf (1968, Dunhill) U.S. #6, U.K. #59, certified gold
 Steppenwolf - The Second (1968, Dunhill) U.S. #3, certified gold
 Steppenwolf - At Your Birthday Party (1969, Dunhill) U.S. #7, certified gold
 Janis Joplin - I Got Dem Ol' Kozmic Blues Again Mama! (1969, Columbia) U.S. #5, certified platinum — uncredited
 Hokus Pokus - Hokus Pokus (1972, Romar)
 Detective - Detective (1977, Swan Song)
 Detective - It Takes One to Know One (1977, Swan Song)
 Detective - Live from the Atlantic Studios (1978, Swan Song)
 Michael Monarch - It Feels So Real (2001, MSR)
 Michael Monarch - Guitar Bazaar (2001, MSR)
 Michael Monarch - The Other Side of the Tracks (2002, MSR)
 Michael Monarch - MM3 (2006, MSR)
 Peyton-Monarch - Lonesome Highway (2021,  MSR)

References

External links

1950 births
Living people
American rock guitarists
American male guitarists
Lead guitarists
Steppenwolf (band) members
Guitarists from Los Angeles
20th-century American guitarists
World Classic Rockers members